Agrypnia may refer to:

The Wake, a 2005 Greek film
Vigil, a period of purposeful sleeplessness, an occasion for devotional watching, or an observance
 A case of sleep deprivation
Insomnia (rarely)
Agrypnia (caddisfly), a genus of caddisflies in the family Phryganeidae.